Enrique Clemente Maza (born 4 March 1999) is a Spanish footballer who plays for UD Las Palmas. Mainly a central defender, he can also play as a left back.

Club career
Born in Zaragoza, Clemente was a Real Zaragoza youth graduate. He made his senior debut with the reserves on 14 January 2018, starting in a 1–2 Segunda División B home loss against Lleida Esportiu.

Clemente was definitely promoted to the B-side in July 2018, after their relegation to Tercera División. In September, he suffered a serious knee injury, being sidelined for the remainder of the season; on 1 October, he extended his contract until 2022, being definitely promoted to the main squad ahead of the 2019–20 campaign.

Clemente made his professional debut on 30 August 2019, playing the full 90 minutes in a 1–0 home win against Elche CF in the Segunda División championship. On 1 October of the following year, he moved to fellow second division side UD Logroñés, on loan for one year.

Clemente scored his first goal as a senior on 1 December 2021, in a Copa del Rey match against CD Mensajero. The following 8 January, he was loaned to fellow second division side Real Sociedad B for the remainder of the season.

On 27 August 2022, Clemente signed a contract with fellow second level team UD Las Palmas.

References

External links

1999 births
Living people
Footballers from Zaragoza
Spanish footballers
Association football defenders
Segunda División players
Segunda División B players
Tercera División players
Real Zaragoza B players
Real Zaragoza players
UD Logroñés players
Real Sociedad B footballers
UD Las Palmas players
Spain youth international footballers
Spain under-21 international footballers